The 1982–83 NBA season was the Warriors' 37th season in the NBA and 20th in the San Francisco Bay Area.

Draft picks

Roster

Regular season

Season standings

z - clinched division title
y - clinched division title
x - clinched playoff spot

Record vs. opponents

Game log

Player statistics

Season

Awards and records

Transactions

References

See also
 1982-83 NBA season

Golden State Warriors seasons
G
Golden
Golden